Indian Oak was launched at Cochin, probably in 1813. She then traded between India and Britain. From circa 1824 she operated as a "country ship" trading primarily in the Indian Ocean. Notable events included arson by the crew, a dispute between her master and the government of Mauritius, transport of 200 labourers from Bengal to Mauritius, and mutiny that resulted in the cutting and maiming of her master. She was wrecked in August 1840 after having delivered troops to Chusan for the First Opium War.

Career
In 1813 the EIC lost its monopoly on the trade between India and Britain. British ships were then free to sail between India or the Indian Ocean and the United Kingdom under a license from the EIC.

On 6 May 1815 Indian Oak was off the Isle of Wight. She had sailed from Bengal on 9 December 1814, and from St Helena on 5 March 1815. Thirteen of the crew were tried before a special Court of Admiralty and convicted of cutting and maiming Captain Rayne with intent to murder. The governor, who was president of the board, commuted their death penalty sentences.

Captain Rayne's injuries, were clearly not severe enough to end his career. On 8 May Indian Oak, Rayne, master, arrived in the Hooghly River from Madras and Port Louis.

A letter from Bombay dated 13 January 1840 reported that the British East India Company (EIC) had chartered a number of vessels to carry coal, provisions, and troops to China in support of the British expedition in the First Opium War. Indian Oak was one of the vessels so chartered. She carried eight officers and 134 men of the Cameronians. She arrived at Penang on 18 April; one man had died of cholera. On 6 May she sailed for Singapore.

Fate
Indian Oak left Chusan on 10 August, after the capture of Chusan. On 14 August she was wrecked about 10 miles north of Napakiang (Naha) at Great Loochow Island (Okinawa). The Okinawans built a junk for the crew and passengers from Indian Oak that was given the name Loochoo.  and  arrived on 16 September. Cruizer left soon after with dispatches. Nimrod and Loochoo, which was carrying the people from Indian Oak, sailed on 28 September and arrived at Chusan on 5 October.

Notes, citations, and references
Notes

Citations

References
 
 
  
 
 

1813 ships
British ships built in India
Age of Sail merchant ships of England
Maritime incidents in August 1840